The 2022 Mercan'Tour Classic Alpes-Maritimes was the second edition of the Mercan'Tour Classic Alpes-Maritimes road cycling one day race, which took place in the titular department in southeastern France on 31 May 2022. It was rated as a category 1.1 race on the 2022 UCI Europe Tour. The race was won by Dane Jakob Fuglsang, which was his first win since the 2020 Il Lombardia.

Teams
Seven UCI WorldTeams, four UCI ProTeams, and six UCI Continental teams made up the seventeen teams that participated in the race. Teams could enter up to seven riders each, but many decided not to do so. Four teams (and ) fielded only six riders each,  only fielded five, while the remaining teams fielded the maximum number allowed.

Of the 113 riders to start the race, only 63 riders finished.

UCI WorldTeams

 
 
 
 
 
 
 

UCI ProTeams

 
 
 
 

UCI Continental Teams

Result

References

Sources

External links
 

Mercan'Tour Classic Alpes-Maritimes
Mercan'Tour Classic Alpes-Maritimes
Mercan'Tour Classic Alpes-Maritimes